Ȋ or ȋ is a letter of the Latin script formed by the addition of an inverted breve accent above the Latin letter I. The letter is not used in any current writing system, nor in any past one. It has historically been used in traditional Slavicist notation of Serbo-Croatian phonology to indicate a long falling accent on an i, when the i is the  nucleus of a syllable.

Computer encoding 

Latin letters with diacritics